Gierczyn  is a village in the administrative district of Gmina Mirsk, within Lwówek Śląski County, Lower Silesian Voivodeship, in south-western Poland, close to the Czech border. 

Notable people
 Andrzej Biegalski, Polish boxer

Bibliography
Birecki T., 1959, "Złoże cyny w Przecznicy (Dolny Śląsk)." [Lode Of Tin Ore In Przecznica (Lower Silesia)]; in: Zeszyty Naukowe AGH, No. 22, Geologia vol.3, pp. 35–53, Kraków (in Polish)

External links
 Gierczyn in Wratislaviae Amici (in Polish)

Villages in Lwówek Śląski County